Hooks is a city in Bowie County, Texas. It is part of the Texarkana metropolitan area and had a population of 2,518 at the 2020 U.S. census.

Geography
Hooks is located at  (33.469439, –94.280385).

Demographics

As of the 2020 U.S. census, there were 2,518 people, 1,161 households, and 760 families residing in the city.

At the 2000 census, there were 2,973 people, 1,215 households, and 840 families residing in the city. The racial makeup of the city was 84.02% White, 10.12% African American, 0.98% Native American, 0.44% Asian, 0.07% Pacific Islander, 1.45% from other races, and 2.93% from two or more races. Hispanic or Latino of any race were 2.96% of the population.

In 2000, there were 1,215 households, of which 33.9% had children under the age of 18 living with them, 50.3% were married couples living together, 15.3% had a female householder with no husband present, and 30.8% were non-families. 28.1% of all households were made up of individuals, and 14.1% had someone living alone who was 65 years of age or older. The average household size was 2.45 and the average family size was 2.96.

The age distribution was 27.2% under the age of 18, 9.0% from 18 to 24, 27.2% from 25 to 44, 21.8% from 45 to 64, and 14.7% who were 65 years of age or older. The median age was 35 years. For every 100 females, there were 86.6 males. For every 100 females age 18 and over, there were 82.5 males at the 2000 census.

The median household income was $32,083, and the median family income was $37,793. Males had a median income of $30,711 versus $20,982 for females. The per capita income for the city was $15,385. About 12.1% of families and 17.1% of the population were below the poverty line, including 22.3% of those under age 18 and 8.8% of those age 65 or over. In 2020, the median household income grew to $49,020.

Education
The city of Hooks is served by the Hooks Independent School District.

Notable people
 Wilbert Brown, offensive lineman with the NFL San Diego Chargers, Washington Redskins, New England Patriots, Super Bowl Champion
 Shane Halter, MLB player Kansas City Royals, New York Mets, Detroit Tigers, Anaheim Angels
 Durwood Merrill (1938–2003), MLB umpire (1977–1999)
 Billy Sims, running back with the NFL Detroit Lions, 1978 Heisman Trophy winner at the University of Oklahoma, 1980 NFL Rookie of the Year
 Jeremiah Trotter, linebacker with the NFL Philadelphia Eagles, Washington Redskins, Stephen F. Austin University four-time Pro Bowler
Gary Wright, race car driver, Sprint car, NASCAR, ARCA Racing

References

Cities in Texas
Cities in Bowie County, Texas
Cities in Texarkana metropolitan area